The Arkansas Bank & Trust Company is a historic commercial building at 103 Walnut Street in Newport, Arkansas.  It is a two-story masonry structure, finished in terra cotta on its two street-facing facades, and brick on the others.  It is an elegant example of Classical Revival architecture, designed by Mann & Stern of Little Rock and completed in 1916.  It is one of the city's finest and most ornately decorated commercial buildings.

The building was listed on the National Register of Historic Places in 1986.

See also
National Register of Historic Places listings in Jackson County, Arkansas

References

Bank buildings on the National Register of Historic Places in Arkansas
Neoclassical architecture in Arkansas
Commercial buildings completed in 1916
Buildings and structures in Jackson County, Arkansas
National Register of Historic Places in Jackson County, Arkansas
Newport, Arkansas